The London Conservatives are the regional party of the Conservative Party that operates in Greater London.

Party strength 
The party's main competition is with the larger London Labour Party for office. They hold 21 of 73 London seats in the House of Commons and 8 of 25 seats in the London Assembly. The party controls 7 of 32 London boroughs, and won 508 out of the 1,851 Councillors in the 2018 local elections.

The party held the Mayoralty of London from 2008 until losing to Labour in 2016.

Mayoral candidates

Current representatives

Members of Parliament 
 Bob Blackman (Harrow East) 
 Louie French (Old Bexley and Sidcup)
 Iain Duncan Smith (Chingford and Woodford Green)
 David Evennett (Bexleyheath and Crayford)
 Nickie Aiken (Cities of London and Westminster)
 Mike Freer (Finchley and Golders Green)
 Stephen Hammond (Wimbledon) 
 Greg Hands (Chelsea and Fulham) 
 David Simmonds (Ruislip, Northwood and Pinner) 
 Boris Johnson (Uxbridge and South Ruislip)
 Gareth Bacon (Orpington) 
 Julia Lopez (Hornchurch and Upminster)
 Bob Neill (Bromley and Chislehurst) 
 Matthew Offord (Hendon) 
 Chris Philp (South Croydon)
 Andrew Rosindell (Romford) 
 Paul Scully (Sutton and Cheam) 
 Bob Stewart (Beckenham) 
 Theresa Villiers (Chipping Barnet)
 Elliot Colburn (Carshalton and Wallington)
 Felicity Buchan (Kensington)

London Assembly members 
 Nicholas Rogers (South West) 
 Peter Fortune (Bexley and Bromley) 
 Shaun Bailey (Londonwide) 
 Andrew Boff (Londonwide) 
 Neil Garratt (Croydon and Sutton)
 Tony Devenish (West Central) 
 Susan Hall (Londonwide) 
 Keith Prince (Havering and Redbridge)
 Emma Best (Londonwide)

Councillors

Directly elected mayors

Electoral performance

General elections

European elections

Regional elections

Greater London Council elections 
The table below shows the results obtained by the London Conservatives in elections to the Greater London Council. The GLC was abolished by the Local Government Act 1985.

Mayoral elections 
The table below shows the London Conservatives results in London Mayoral elections since 2000.

Assembly elections 
The table below shows the London Conservatives results in London Assembly elections since 2000.

Borough council elections 
The table below shows the London Conservatives results in elections for the London Boroughs.

References 

 
Conservative parties in the United Kingdom
Politics of London